The women's 200m individual medley SM13 event at the 2008 Summer Paralympics took place at the Beijing National Aquatics Center on 12 September. There were no heats in this event.

Final

Competed at 19:45.

WR = World Record.

References
 
 

Swimming at the 2008 Summer Paralympics
2008 in women's swimming